Charaxes cedreatis, the green demon charaxes, is a butterfly in the family Nymphalidae. It is found in Guinea, Sierra Leone, Liberia, Ivory Coast, Ghana, Nigeria, Cameroon, Bioko, Gabon, the Republic of the Congo, the Central African Republic, southern Sudan, northern Angola, the Democratic Republic of the Congo, Uganda, south-western Kenya, western Tanzania and north-western Zambia.

Description

The male differs from that of Charaxes etheocles in the greenish sheen in the basal third of the upperside of the forewing. It is possible that there are a number of female forms
not been properly associated with cedreatis  

Aurivillius in Seitz-Female f. cedreatis Hew. Forewing above at the base to the white transverse band and hindwing to 5 mm.  from the distal margin olive-grey; the white transverse band of the forewing in cellules 2—6 5mm. in breadth and sharply defined, in la indistinct; apical part black with 2 whitish postdiscal spots in 6 and 7. Hindwing with whitish submarginal and greenish marginal streaks. Above coloured and marked as in the females of tiridates and numenes. Gold Coast to Angola.

Biology
The habitat consists of evergreen forests, Brachystegia (Miombo) woodland and riverine forests.
Notes on the biology of cedreatis are given by Pringle et al. (1994), Larsen, T.B. (1991), Larsen, T.B. (2005) and  Kielland, J. (1990).

The larvae feed on Albizia brownei, Albizia grandibracteata, Albizia zygia, Griffonia simplicifolia, Annona senegalensis, Dalbergia lactea and Scutia myrtina.

The typical khaki-coloured female apparently mimics females of the much larger species tiridates, numenes and bipunctatus, a phenomenon known as ‘Swynnertonian mimicry’.

Taxonomy
Charaxes cedreatis is a member of the large species group Charaxes etheocles

References

Seitz, A. Die Gross-Schmetterlinge der Erde 13: Die Afrikanischen Tagfalter. Plate XIII 33 c
Victor Gurney Logan Van Someren, 1969 Revisional notes on African Charaxes (Lepidoptera: Nymphalidae). Part V. Bulletin of the British Museum (Natural History) (Entomology)75-166.

External links
Charaxes cedreatis images at Charaxes page Consortium for the Barcode of Life subspecies and forms
Images of C. cedreatis Royal Museum for Central Africa (Albertine Rift Project)
African Butterfly Database Range map via search

Butterflies described in 1874
cedreatis
Butterflies of Africa
Taxa named by William Chapman Hewitson